Luis Enrique Hernández Casiano (born February 10, 1996, in Florencio Villarreal, Guerrero) is a Mexican professional footballer who last played for Pachuca. He made his professional debut with Loros UdeC during an Ascenso MX defeat to Celaya on 23 July 2016.

Honours

International
Mexico U17
 CONCACAF U-17 Championship: 2013
 FIFA U-17 World Cup runner-up: 2013

References

1996 births
Living people
Mexican footballers
Association football midfielders
Tecos F.C. footballers
Loros UdeC footballers
Ascenso MX players
Liga Premier de México players
Footballers from Guerrero